Located on the Mississippi River, the metropolitan area of Memphis is one of the largest in the Southeastern United States, ranking 42nd in the United States according to the 2010 census. The city has historically been one of the largest shipping hubs in the Mid-South, dating back to the Civil War, when the port was one of the largest on the Mississippi River and served as a shipping hub for the Confederacy.

As transportation methods developed, Memphis has continued to hold significance as a transportation hub. Now the city is home to the second largest cargo airport in the world, Memphis International Airport, and the world’s busiest domestic airport with 3.9 million metric tonnes. Memphis International Airport and Memphis have had huge significance in the railroad industry. The city has the 3rd largest rail center in the U.S. behind Chicago and St. Louis. It is also one of only four U.S. cities with five Class 1 railroads.

Because Memphis has been such an important city for transportation and shipping, it is attractive to businesses, especially those producing goods shipped nationwide. Three Fortune 500 companies, FedEx, AutoZone and International Paper Co. call Memphis home. These significant businesses have brought a large manufacturing industry. Of the 607,900 jobs in Memphis in July 2014, 209,900 are in the manufacturing and transportation industries, around 34.5 percent.

Over the years, the city has become less dependent on its manufacturing and transportation sectors and has diversified its economy especially in services. The Gross Domestic Product of the private sector good-producing industries have grown from $8,309 million to $11,459 million from 2003 to 2013. Over that same time period, the private sector service industries grew from $39,354 million to $48,641 million.

Companies

Publicly traded firms headquartered in Memphis
FedEx, world's largest airfreight firm and 45th-ranked company on the Fortune 500 (2021).
International Paper, manufactures paper products and the 141st-ranked company on the Fortune 500 (2021).
AutoZone Incorporated, operates over 6,900 auto parts stores in the United States and Mexico and the 248th-ranked company on the Fortune 500 (2021).
First Horizon National Corporation, operates First Tennessee and First Horizon bank, the 686th-ranked company on the Fortune 500 (2021).
Mueller Industries, fabricates metal tubes and fittings and the 861st-ranked company on the Fortune 500 (2021).
Terminix, one of the world's largest pest control companies and the 923rd-ranked company on the Fortune 500 (2021).
Mid-America Apartments, real estate investment trust owning apartment communities.

Private firms headquartered in Memphis
Baker, Donelson, Bearman, Caldwell & Berkowitz, law firm
Barnhart Crane and Rigging, specialty heavy lifting and heavy transport
Belz Enterprises, develops, owns and manages real estate throughout the United States and Puerto Rico
Guardsmark, security and investigation firm
Katt Worldwide Logistics, a transportation firm
Lenny's Sub Shop, restaurant chain
Malco Theatres, an operator of movie theatres
Ozark Motor Lines, a transportation company
Perkins and Marie Callender's, restaurant chain
Varsity Brands, manufactures uniforms and runs camps
American Residential Services, also known as ARS/Rescue Rooter
City Gear, a clothing store selling streetwear clothing.

Major divisions or operations
Allenburg Cotton, part of Louis Dreyfus, trades and brokers cotton, along with shipping, ginning, and warehousing.
Cargill Cotton, part of Cargill Incorporated, trades and brokers cotton, along with shipping, ginning, and warehousing.
Carrier plant for central air conditioning, located in Collierville. Carrier is part of United Technologies.
Evergreen Packaging, packaging company owned by Reynolds Group Holdings

Information Technology world headquarters and data center for Hilton Hotels is located on Crossover Lane.
Morgan Keegan & Company, Inc. investment banking firm, subsidiary of Raymond James Financial, Inc., Headquartered in the eponymous tower at Jefferson and Front streets in downtown Memphis.
Nike,  footwear distribution center and other distribution facilities.
Nucor Steel Memphis Inc. manufactures special bar quality carbon steel in a plant on Paul R. Lowry Road.
Orthopaedic Reconstruction and Trauma division world headquarters of Smith & Nephew is located on Brooks Road.
Spinal and Biologics division headquarters of Medtronic is located in Memphis.
Williams-Sonoma, Inc., primary global distribution facilities.
Y&S Candies plant, which makes Twizzlers and Bubble Yum chewing gum, is located on Kansas Street. Y&S is part of The Hershey Company.

Nonprofits
Ducks Unlimited
Methodist Healthcare, operates seven hospitals, multiple home health agencies and outpatient clinics
St. Jude Children's Research Hospital, pediatric treatment and research facility.

Former major companies 
 Union Planters Bank, financial institution and multi-state bank holding company (founded in 1869, acquired by Regions in 2004)
 National Bank of Commerce, regional bank holding company (founded in 1873, acquired by SunTrust in 2005)
Piggly Wiggly, national supermarket chain with 2,660 locations in 1932 (founded in 1916, relocated to Jacksonville in 1939) 
 Holiday Inn, worldwide chain of hotels and formerly motels (founded in 1952, relocated to Atlanta in 1985)
 Fred's, discount convenience store chain with 557 locations in 2019 (relocated to Memphis from Coldwater, MS in 1953, declared bankruptcy in 2019)
 GTx Incorporated, pharmaceutical company (founded in 1997, merged with Oncternal Therapeutics in 2019)
 ServiceMaster, commercial cleaning services company (relocated to Memphis from Chicago in 2007, split with Terminix in 2020 and relocated to Atlanta)

Government entities
Internal Revenue Service, two service centers: Accounts Management Center and Compliance Service Center.
Memphis Light, Gas and Water ("MLG&W") is also one of the largest municipal utilities in the United States.
Naval Support Activity Mid-South (Millington)
Regional Medical Center at Memphis (The Med), an acute-care teaching hospital operated by Shelby County.

Entertainment industry
The entertainment and film industry has also developed in recent years in the city. Major motion pictures filmed in Memphis include Making the Grade (1984), U2: Rattle & Hum, (1988) Mystery Train (1989), Great Balls of Fire! (1989),  Trespass (1991), The Firm (1993), A Family Thing (1996), The People vs. Larry Flynt (1996), The Rainmaker (1997), Cast Away (2000), The Queens of Comedy (2001), 21 Grams (2003), Hustle & Flow (2005), Walk the Line (2005), Forty Shades of Blue (2005), Black Snake Moan (2007), Nothing But the Truth (2008), and The Blind Side  (2009).

Further reading
Finger, Michael. Big Empties: Memphis landmarks that have stood vacant for years, waiting for someone to bring them back to life. The Memphis Flyer, December 4, 1997.
 Rushing, Wanda. Memphis and the Paradox of Place: Globalization in the American South. Chapel Hill: University of North Carolina Press, 2009.
 Rushing, Wanda. Memphis: Cotton Fields, Cargo Planes, & Biotechnology. Southern Spaces, August 28, 2009.

References

 
Memphis metropolitan area